Roger Cunliffe, 3rd Baron Cunliffe (born 12 January 1932), is a retired architect and consulting project manager. He specialised in project strategy, particularly for office buildings, museums and exhibition complexes, and for city planning, both in the UK and overseas. He designed various museums and office buildings, and was the job architect of the listed Commonwealth Institute in Holland Park, London. He and his wife now have a small farm and woodlands in Suffolk.

The title of baron was granted to his grandfather, who was chairman of the Governors of the Bank of England 1914–1918, on 14 December 1914.

Background
Roger Cunliffe was born at Furneux Pelham, Hertfordshire, on 12 January 1932, the eldest son of Rolf and Joan Cunliffe. He had two older sisters, Shirley (died 2007) and Corinna, and one younger brother Merlin. His father was a banker by trade and a wartime wing-commander in the RAF. He was also an avid collector of Chinese artworks and became the honorary keeper of the Far Eastern collections at the Fitzwilliam Museum.

Roger Cunliffe (BA, MA) switched from engineering to architecture at Trinity College, Cambridge, after attending Eton College. He continued his education at the Architectural Association (AADipl) and the Open University. He moved his family to Chicago in the USA in 1960 to work with the architect Harry Weese. They returned to England in 1963. He was made the Director of the Architectural Association 1969–1971. He worked for RMJM and was later director of Exhibition Consultants Ltd. Among his qualifications and professional associations were the following: RIBA, MCMI, MAPM; board member of Lancing College, Goldsmiths College and the College of Estate Management (Hon Fellow); Vice-Chairman, British Consultants Bureau; Court of the Goldsmiths Company (Prime Warden 1997–1998); Trustee, William Blake Trust; Chairman of the Suffolk Craft Society; Hon DUniv University Campus Suffolk. Cunliffe was awarded an honorary doctorate from the University of Essex in 2008.

He married Clemency Ann Hoare in 1957 after meeting her while they were both working in Greece. They have three children.

He has written for the national and professional press, and co-authored two books: Office Buildings with Leonard Manasseh in 1962 and Tomorrow's Office with Santa Raymond in 1995.

Arms

References

Beamish, David. United Kingdom peerage creations 1801 to 2005: a list compiled by David Beamish.
Black, Adam and Charles, Who's Who (1964).
Debretts, People of Today (1994).
Raymond and Cunliffe Tomorrow's Office (1997).
Bonham's catalog 1793 The Cunliffe Collection (2002).
University Campus Suffolk web site article 15 July 2008. http://www.ucs.ac.uk/about/News/16072008.aspx
David Hencke, Westminster correspondent guardian.co.uk, Friday 26 November 2004.

1932 births
People educated at Eton College
Alumni of Trinity College, Cambridge
Living people
Barons in the Peerage of the United Kingdom
People from Furneux Pelham
Cunliffe